Galles Racing is a former auto racing team owned by Rick Galles that competed in the CART series, Can-Am and the Indy Racing League. The team won the 1990 CART championship as well as the 1992 Indianapolis 500 with driver Al Unser Jr. The team won a total of 21 Indy car races along its history. In addition to Unser's 1992 victory, the team finished second at Indianapolis on three separate occasions (1989, 1990, 1996).

In 1992, the team notably fielded their own in-house Galmer chassis. The team achieved two victories with the car during its very brief foray into the sport.

History

1980s
The team first competed in a partial CART season in 1980, then was away from CART until 1983 when it fielded a car for rookie Al Unser Jr.  Unser left the team after the 1984 season.

For 1985, Galles fielded the Buick V-6 engine at the Indy 500, with driver Pancho Carter winning the pole position. Carter, however, dropped out early and finished last.

In 1986-1987, Galles Racing became the primary support team for the new Brabham-Honda engine (later known as the Judd AV). Geoff Brabham and Jeff MacPherson fielded the engine at Indy in 1987, with MacPherson finishing a respectable 8th. Later in the season, Brabham scored second-place finishes at the Pocono 500 and at Road America.

In 1988, Al Unser Jr. returned to the team, and the entry was granted a lease for the Ilmor Chevrolet Indy-V-8 engine. In 1989, Unser Jr. then driving his familiar Valvoline-sponsored Chevy machine, nearly won the Indy 500, finishing second after crashing out with just over a lap to go in a famous duel with Emerson Fittipaldi.

Championship years
After the 1989 season, Galles merged teams with Maurice Kranes (who had fielded Kraco-sponsored cars for Michael Andretti and then Bobby Rahal). Kranes brought Rahal and Kraco with him, while Unser Jr. remained in the Valvoline-sponsored machine. The team competed as Galles-Kraco Racing from 1990 to 1992 and Unser won the 1990 CART Championship with five wins. The Galles-Kraco duo of Unser and Bobby Rahal was one of the top teams in CART during that period. Unser and Rahal teamed up for three 1-2 finishes, including the 1990 Michigan 500. The two drivers finished on the podium in the same race six times. Rahal himself earned an impressive, yet frustrating, eleven second-place finishes for the team in 1990-1991. Rahal finished fourth in the championship in 1990 and second in the championship in 1991, winning one race in 1991.

Al Unser Jr. finished third in points in both 1991 and 1992.

Rahal was replaced in 1992 by veteran Danny Sullivan as the team introduced their new proprietary Galmer chassis. Unser won the 1992 Indianapolis 500 in a Galmer in what would be the closest finish in race history. Despite winning, the Galmer chassis was scrapped after only one season. Sullivan won the race at Long Beach, after being involved in a controversial incident with less than four laps to go. Unser Jr. was leading the race, and Sullivan was running second. The two cars tangled, and Unser was sent spinning into a tire barrier, while Sullivan went on to win. The incident created friction inside the team.

Unser and Sullivan retained their seats in 1993, and were joined by Kevin Cogan and Mexican rookie Adrián Fernández, who would share a third car for selected races throughout the season. At the 1993 Indy 500, Sullivan was the first to retire from the race after a crash, but Unser finished in 8th place and Cogan finished 14th. After a lackluster season that saw only three podium finishes, Unser would leave for Penske Racing, and Sullivan moved into semi-retirement (he raced stock cars in 1994, and raced for PacWest in 1995). The final two wins of Sullivan's Indy car career came with the team, but it was later revealed that behind-the-scenes, there was a toxic atmosphere and internal friction inside the team that got worse when Sullivan tangled with Unser; it led to Sullivan being fired before the season concluded, right when Sullivan was not in a position to easily find himself a new job.

For 1994, Fernández was the team's lone entry, as the team reverted to its Galles Racing name. Fernández was joined by Brazilian journeyman Marco Greco for 1995, with a 3rd place for Fernández at the Michigan 500 being their best finish for the season.

Transition to IRL
1996 saw several drivers in Galles cars as the team was one of the few CART teams to cross over and compete in the rival Indy Racing League's first Indianapolis 500 with driver Davy Jones who finished second.  Jones also drove a partial schedule in CART while rookie and former Motorcycle champion Eddie Lawson drove Galles' full-time CART entry.  In 1997 the team moved full-time to the IRL with rookie Kenny Bräck. Bräck switched to A. J. Foyt Enterprises for 1998 and the team again ceased operations.  Galles returned in 1999 with veteran Davey Hamilton.  Hamilton was replaced in 2000 by a returning Al Unser Jr., who was switching over from CART after being released from Penske Racing.  Unser was one of the first CART stars to switch full-time to the IRL.  The team's final year was 2001 where Unser was joined by rookies Didier André and Casey Mears.

Summary
Throughout the team's 22-year history, their drivers captured 21 wins - 18 by Al Unser Jr. (6 in 1990, 4 in 1988, 2 in 1991 and 1 each in 1984, 1989, 1992, 1993, 2000, and 2001), two by Danny Sullivan (1 each in 1992 and 1993), and one by Bobby Rahal in 1991 in addition to capturing the 1990 CART championship and 1992 Indianapolis 500 with Unser.

Former drivers

CART
 Geoff Brabham (1985-1987)
 Pancho Carter (1984-1986)
 Kevin Cogan (1993)
 Dick Ferguson (1980)
 Adrián Fernández (1993-1995)
 Tom Gloy (1984)
 Marco Greco (1995)
 Davy Jones (1996)
 Eddie Lawson (1996)
 Jeff MacPherson (1987)
 Roberto Moreno (1985-1986)
 Bobby Rahal (1990-1991)
 Danny Sullivan (1992-1993)
 Al Unser Jr. (1983-1984, 1988-1993)

IRL
 Didier André (2001)
 Kenny Bräck (1997)
 Marco Greco (1997)
 Davey Hamilton (1999)
 Davy Jones (1996)
 Casey Mears (2001)
 Al Unser Jr. (2000-2001)
 Jeff Ward (1997)

Racing Results

Complete CART results
(key)

Indy Racing League results
(key)

IndyCar wins

References

External links
Galles Racing statistics at Race Database

Champ Car teams
IndyCar Series teams
American auto racing teams